Gökdeniz Bayrakdar (born 23 November 2001) is a Turkish professional footballer who plays as a winger for TFF First League club Bodrumspor on loan from Antalyaspor. He has represented Turkey at youth level.

Early years
Gökdeniz Bayrakdar was born on 23 November 2001, in Kandıra, Kocaeli Province to a family originally from Trabzon. He has two older brothers, and his father owns a grocery story, and his mother is a housewife. As his family were passionate Trabzonspor fans, Bayrakdar was named after their club legend, Gökdeniz Karadeniz.

Bayrakdar quickly became devoted to football, and started playing on the streets. At age nine, he was enrolled by his father at a football school in his hometown of Kandıra, before playing in the youth teams of Yenişehirspor and Kandıra. He was then scouted by Kocaelispor after three successful training sessions.

Club career

Kocaelispor
Bayrakdar made his senior debut after one year at the Kocaelispor academy as a substitute in a 1–0 Turkish Cup loss to Düzcespor on 30 August 2017. His first league appearance followed on 10 September, as he came off the bench in 77th minute for Burak Süleyman in a 2–1 home loss to Uşakspor in the fourth level TFF Third League. On 15 October, Bayrakdar scored his first goal in a 1–1 draw against Osmaniyespor.

Antalyaspor
After successful seasons and interest from Beşiktaş, Bayrakdar signed a contract with Antalyaspor in the summer of 2020 after Kocaelispor's 10-year transfer ban had been lifted. Bayrakdar made his professional debut for the club on 19 September 2020, coming off the bench for Nuri Şahin in a 1–1 Süper Lig draw against Beşiktaş on 19 September 2020, scoring his side's only goal in his debut.

Bodrumspor
On 11 January 2023, Bayrakdar joined Bodrumspor on loan until the end of the 2022–23 season, with an option to buy.

International career
Bayrakdar has been capped for Turkey U19 and Turkey U21.

Style of play
Bayrakdar has been utilised in a variety of positions due to his technical skill set and his understanding of the game. He can play as a striker, a winger or as an attacking midfielder. Usually deployed on the right wing, Bayrakdar often cuts inside on his left foot to move to a more central attacking position, and uses his speed and dribbling skills to take on defenders until he finds the space to make an attempt on goal, much like Arjen Robben. In addition, he has a pronounced goal instinct.

Career statistics

Club

References

External links
 
 

2001 births
Living people
People from Kandıra
Turkish footballers
Turkey youth international footballers
Turkey under-21 international footballers
Association football wingers
Antalyaspor footballers
Kocaelispor footballers
Süper Lig players
TFF First League players
TFF Third League players